was a football stadium in Osaka, Osaka, Japan. It hosted the 1960 Emperor's Cup and final game between Furukawa Electric and Keio BRB on May 6, 1960.

Defunct football venues in Japan
Sports venues in Osaka
Sports venues completed in 1955
1955 establishments in Japan
1996 disestablishments in Japan